The Seulingswald (also called the Sillingswald) is a hill range in the German Central Uplands which reaches heights of up to . It is part of the  Fulda-Werra Uplands in the East Hesse Highlands within the Hessian county of Hersfeld-Rotenburg; small ridges extend into the Thuringian county of Wartburgkreis. It is a sandstone range and one of the largest contiguous woodland areas in Hesse.

Geography

Location 
The Seulingswald is located between the settlements of Ronshausen to the north and Wildeck to the northeast (both in Hesse), Großensee and Dankmarshausen to the east-northeast (both in Thuringia), Heringen to the east, Friedewald to the south, Bad Hersfeld to the southwest, Ludwigsau to the west and Bebra to the northwest (all in Hesse).

To the north, on the other side of the Ulfe valley, are the Richelsdorf Hills. To the east the little hill range borders on the Werra. Small-scale east-northeastern spurs descend on the far side of Hessian Kleinensee  to the River Suhl near  Thuringian Großensee. In the south the nearest streams are the Fulda and Werra on the heights of Friedewald before their confluence. This delineates the southern boundary of the Seulingswald, which transitions here into the Kuppen Rhön. To the west, on the far side of the Fulda, is the Knüll.

Natural regions 
The Seulingswald forms an eponymous natural region (no. 357.20) within sub-unit Solztrotten and Seulingswald (357) which in turn is part of the major unit of the Fulda-Werra Uplands (no. 35), which is part of the major unit group of the East Hesse Highlands (no. 35). Its east-northeastern ridges fall within the major unit of the Salzungen Werra Upland (359), and the subunit of the Salzungen-Herleshausen Werra Valley (359.1) and the natural region of the Berka Basin (359.12).

Hills 
The hills of the Seulingswald include the following – sorted by height in metres (m) above sea level (NHN):

Spoil tip:
 Monte Kali (530 m), Hersfeld-Rotenburg

Hills and high points:
 Toter Mann (480.3 m), Hersfeld-Rotenburg
 Gnishecke (470.8 m), Hersfeld-Rotenburg
 Stangenrück (465.7 m), Hersfeld-Rotenburg
 Schwalbenkopf (454.7 m), Hersfeld-Rotenburg
 Siebertsberg (449.1 m), Hersfeld-Rotenburg
 Hornungskuppe (444.1 m), Hersfeld-Rotenburg/Wartburgkreis
 Hermesberg (444.7 m), Hersfeld-Rotenburg/Wartburgkreis
 Kornberg (435.1 m), Hersfeld-Rotenburg
 Roteberg (434.4 m), Hersfeld-Rotenburg
 Plessenberg (402 m), Hersfeld-Rotenburg
 Wackenbühl (419.0 m), Hersfeld-Rotenburg
 Kimmenberg (416.4 m), Hersfeld-Rotenburg
 Kirchenkopf (398.6 m), Hersfeld-Rotenburg
 Waltersberg (388 m), Hersfeld-Rotenburg
 Schwarzenberg (381.8 m), Hersfeld-Rotenburg
 Großer Steinkopf (375.4 m), Hersfeld-Rotenburg
 Höneberg (354.7 m), Hersfeld-Rotenburg
 Heiligenberg (Seulingswald) (317.3 m), Hersfeld-Rotenburg/Wartburgkreis
 Hoher Berg (314.7 m), Hersfeld-Rotenburg
 Burbachsrück (340.5 m), Hersfeld-Rotenburg
 Gellenberg (340.4 m), Hersfeld-Rotenburg
 Wolfberg (334.7 m), Hersfeld-Rotenburg
 Hagelsberg (326.9 m), Hersfeld-Rotenburg
 Auf'm Berg (324.6 m), Hersfeld-Rotenburg
 Spießberg (300.5 m), Hersfeld-Rotenburg
 Obersberg (299.6 m), Hersfeld-Rotenburg
 Lerchenberg (Seulingswald) (287.5 m), Wartburgkreis
 Schottenberg (271.1 m), Hersfeld-Rotenburg

Protected areas 
In the central area and extended to the west-northwest of the Seulingswald is the protected landscape of Seulingswald (CDDA-No. 378688; designated in 1979; 30,2656 km²). In large parts of the forested areas is the Seulingswald Special Area of Conservation (FFH No. 378688; 23.2315 km²). Near the Ulfe is the natural woodland reserve of Goldbachs- und Ziebachsrück which has an area of 31 ha.

History 
On 27 September 1944 there was a major air battle over the Seulingswald between the US Air Force and the Luftwaffe, known as the  Kassel Mission, which saw extremely high losses.

Transport and hiking 
The Seulingswald is crossed by the A4 motorway roughly in a northeast-southwest direction. At the junction of Bad Hersfeld it passes over the B27 federal highway which runs from the west of the region northwards towards Bebra. There  the Landesstraße 3251 branches of the B 27 and passes north of the Seulingswald heading east through Ronshausen to Hönebach on the Thuringian state border. The E6 European long distance path runs between Hönebach and Friedewald, in places running parallel to the motorway.

Footnotes and references

See also 
 List of mountains and hills of Hesse

Central Uplands
Mountain ranges of Thuringia
Forests and woodlands of Thuringia
! Salzungen Werra Upland
Regions of Hesse
East Hesse
Hersfeld-Rotenburg
Wartburgkreis